"Filhall" is a Punjabi/Hindi song written by Jaani and sung by B Praak. The video of the song is directed by Arvindr Khaira and the music is produced by B Praak. This song features Akshay Kumar and Nupur Sanon in the music video.

Cast
 Akshay Kumar as Dr Kabir Malhotra
 Nupur Sanon as Meher Grewal
 Asmita Sood as Kabir's wife
 Ammy Virk as Meher's husband

Music video
The music video titled "Filhall" was released by Desi Melodies on YouTube. This is the debut music video of Akshay Kumar. It also introduces Nupur Sanon, Kriti Sanon's sister, to the audiences.

The video shows story of two lovers who were separated due to some circumstances coincidentally met after few years. The song basically depicts their feelings at that time that they again want to be together but can't because they both are with someone else now.

Reception 
The Song become a marginal hit in 2019. It received more than 13 million views on YouTube within 24 hours of the official release. It became the fastest Indian music video to reach 100, 200, 300, million views on YouTube. As of 20 June 2021, The song has 1 billion views on YouTube.

Sequel 

On 23 January 2020, Akshay Kumar and the whole team announced the sequel to Filhall. The shoot of the song was delayed because of the COVID-19 Pandemic in India. On 24 June 2021, Akshay Kumar, B Praak, Jaani and the whole team shared the official poster of the song named "Filhaal2 Mohabbat" stating that the teaser will be released on 30 June 2021. The song was released on 6 July 2021.

Charts

References

External links 

 

Punjabi-language songs
2019 songs